Twelve Year Silence is the first album by American rock band Dark New Day. It was released on June 14, 2005 by Warner Bros. Records. The first single, "Brother", received moderate airplay on radio, and has proven to be a surprise hit. The song came pre-installed on the Xbox 360's Custom Mix playlist. The song "Pieces" was in the soundtrack for WWE Smackdown! vs. Raw 2006 while "Taking Me Alive" was featured during the end credits of the 2005 version of House of Wax.

Track listing

Personnel
Dark New Day
 Brett Hestla -  vocals, additional guitar
 Clint Lowery - lead guitar, vocals
 Troy McLawhorn - rhythm guitar, backing vocals
 Corey Lowery - bass, backing vocals
 Will Hunt - drums, backing vocals

Additional personnel
 Justin Thomas - engineer, producer
 Paul Pavao - assistant
 Blumpy - digital editing
 Ben Grosse - mixing
 Ted Jensen - mastering
 P. R. Brown - design, photography
 Damon Booth - A&R
 James Dowdall - A&R
 Karl Rybacki - A&R

Charts 

Album

Singles

References

2005 debut albums
Dark New Day albums
Warner Records albums